Erguotou is a Chinese liquor. It is a type of light-aroma baijiu made from sorghum. The most famous brands are Red Star (红星, Hóngxīng) and Niulanshan (牛栏山), both from Beijing. It is available in various strengths, the average being 50% alcohol by volume or 100 proof.

"Red Star was the first distillery formed in the People's Republic [of China]" In 1949, many of the old distilleries had either been destroyed in the civil war or gone out of business, so it was a group of twelve former baijiu distilleries that came together to form the new 'Red Star' distillery. "Red Star master blender Wang Qiufang watered down the èrguōtóu from the standard 68 percent alcohol level to a more palatable 65...a Japanese Communist who fought against his compatriots in World War II designed the label, which also remains more or less unchanged." 

The name "second distillation" [二锅头] indicates its level of purity. It is a clear, potent spirit and takes six months to produce. It is one of the most commonly drunk baijiu in Beijing, and thus has a deep cultural association with China's capital and beyond. According to Drunk in China author Derek Sandhaus, it is considered "the Coca-Cola of baijius".

See also
Baijiu
Maotai

References

Baijiu
Chinese distilled drinks
Beijing cuisine